Clue is a menstrual health app developed by the Berlin-based technology company BioWink GmbH. The app has over 8 million users from 180 different countries. The startup has raised $10 million from backers that include Union Square Ventures and Mosaic Ventures.

History

Clue was co-founded by Ida Tin, the company's current CEO, Hans Raffauf, Mike LaVigne and Moritz von Buttlar in 2012. BioWink GmbH launched the app in 2013. Ida Tin’s stated goal was to take female reproductive health “out of taboo land” and to start “a reproductive health revolution.” Tin previously led motorbike tours around the world and wrote a book about her experience.

By July 2017, the Clue app had more than 8 million active users on both Android and iOS. Users were representative of more than 180 countries. In 2015, BioWink GmbH closed a $7 million Series A funding round led by Union Square Ventures and Mosaic Ventures, bringing the company's total funding to $10 million. The company was listed as one of Europe's Hottest Startups in 2015 by Wired UK, with Clue being named one of the best apps in 2015 by both Apple and Google.

In March 2018, the company launched an editorial site to serve as a resource for accessible and scientific menstrual health information.

Mobile app

The Clue mobile application calculates and predicts a user's period, fertile window, and premenstrual syndrome. It also informs users the most or least likely time for becoming pregnant and allows them to track more than 30 health categories, including sex, sleep, pain, exercise, hair, skin, digestion, emotions and energy. The app can also explain how pill dosages impact fertility and includes an alarm system to allow for reminders for taking pills.

In 2015, the company closed a Series A funding round and announced plans to use the proceeds to expand features of the mobile app and hire more staff. Clue also partnered with universities such as Stanford University, Columbia University, University of Washington, and University of Oxford to advance female health research.

Clue integrated with Apple Inc.'s HealthKit for iOS 9 in September 2015, allowing data such as body temperature, cervical mucus quality, menstruation, ovulation test results, sexual activity, and spotting directly to the app.

In 2016, Clue was available in 15 languages on both iOS and Android. That same year, Clue introduced a cycle-sharing feature and in 2017 a pill-tracking option.

In February 2018, Clue made its app available on the Fitbit Ionic smartwatch.

References

External links
 Clue official website

Mobile applications
IOS software
Android (operating system) software
Human pregnancy
Companies based in Berlin
Women's health